Paola Tampieri (born 26 April 1975) is an Italian former professional tennis player.

Tampieri competed on the professional tour in the 1990s and had a best singles world ranking of 256. She was a main draw qualifier at the 1992 Italian Open and won an ITF title at Orbetello in 1996.

ITF finals

Singles: 1 (1–1)

Doubles: 1 (0–1)

References

External links
 
 

1975 births
Living people
Italian female tennis players